Seraina Sturzenegger (born 25 September 1997) is a Swiss swimmer. She competed in the women's 50 metre backstroke event at the 2018 FINA World Swimming Championships (25 m), in Hangzhou, China.

References

External links
 

1997 births
Living people
Swiss female backstroke swimmers
Place of birth missing (living people)
21st-century Swiss women